The Algeria national football team has played teams from every confederation except OFC. Their first international was played on January 6, 1963, in Algiers against Bulgaria winning 2–1. The team they have played the most is Tunisia, with a total of 41 games played. Their biggest win has been by 15 goals against South Yemen in 1973.

Competition records

FIFA World Cup record

Olympic Games record

 Prior to the Barcelona 1992 campaign, the Football at the Summer Olympics was open to full senior national teams.

Africa Cup of Nations record

African Games record

 Algeria withdrew in protest at CAF's decision to order a replay of the first leg against Tunisia; CAF had made this decision following Tunisia's protest that Algeria had fielded two ineligible players.

African Nations Championship record

Mediterranean Games Record

from 1991 U21 teams.

Prior to the Athens 1991 campaign, the Football at the Mediterranean Games was open to full senior national teams.
 Algeria participated with the national B team in 1975 and 1987.

Arab Nations Cup record

 Algeria participated with the national University team
 Algeria participated with the national U-23 team

Pan Arab Games record

 Algeria participated with the B team

Other records

Head-to-head record

Last match updated was against  on 16 January 2022. 
CAF:

Rest of the World:

Notes:
 (†) Defunct national teams
 (*) Results for  West Germany listed separately
 (**) Results as

Statistics by Confederation
Last update: As of 7 June 2018

Asian Football Confederation

Confederation of African Football

Americas

Union of European Football Associations

Oceania Football Confederation

By competition

Team yet to play against Algeria

Notes

References

Record
Algeria national football team records and statistics
National association football team all-time records